Monroe Washington Gooden (May 10, 1848 – January 19, 1915) was a politician in Tennessee. He served in the Union Army during the American Civil War. He served in the Tennessee General Assembly as a Democrat, representing Fayette County from 1887 until 1889.

See also
African Americans in Tennessee
African-American officeholders during and following the Reconstruction era

References

1848 births
1915 deaths
Tennessee Democrats
People from Fayette County, Tennessee
Union Army soldiers
Tennessee General Assembly
19th-century African-American people
African Americans in the American Civil War
20th-century African-American people